In Lorestan Province, Shahrak Emam Khomeyni and Shahrak-e Emam Khomeyni may refer to:

 Shahrak-e Emam Khomeyni, Delfan
 Shahrak Emam Khomeyni, Kuhdasht